HeidelbergCement is a German multinational building materials company headquartered in Heidelberg, Germany. It is a DAX corporation and is one of the largest building materials companies in the world. On 1 July 2016, HeidelbergCement AG completed the acquisition of a 45% shareholding in Italcementi. That acquisition made HeidelbergCement the number one producer of construction aggregates, the number 2 in cement and number 3 in ready mixed concrete worldwide. In the 2020 Forbes Global 2000, HeidelbergCement was ranked as the 678th -largest public company in the world.

The enlarged group has activities in around 60 countries with 57,000 employees working at 3,000 production sites. HeidelbergCement operates 139 cement plants with an annual cement capacity of 176 million tonnes, more than 1,500 ready-mixed concrete production sites, and over 600 aggregates quarries.

Due to its extremely -intensive cement production, HeidelbergCement is one of the world's major emitters of  emissions and is therefore subject to corresponding criticism.

History

The company was founded on 5 June 1874 by Johann Philipp Schifferdecker, at Heidelberg, Baden-Württemberg, Germany. It was making 80,000 tonnes per annum of Portland cement in 1896. It acquired numerous other small companies from 1914 onwards, and by 1936, it was making one million tonnes per annum.

Following the Nazi seizure of power in 1933, the cement industry profited massively from state-run construction and armaments projects, leading to a generally positive view of the policies of the Reich government among workers and management of the company. The company's general director Otto Heuer had joined the NSDAP on May 1, 1933, and was a member of the Freundeskreis Reichsführer SS. During the Second World War, the cement industry was classified as essential to the war effort and initially experienced only minor restrictions in production. As the war progressed, prisoners of war and forced labourers were used in numerous plants; according to the company, the number of people affected is estimated at 1,000.

Activities abroad began with the acquisition of part of Vicat Cement, France. Shipments reached 8.3 million tonnes in 1972. In 1977, a massive program of purchases in North America began with the acquisition of Lehigh Cement. In 1990, expansion in eastern Europe began.

In 1993, it acquired part of SA Cimenteries CBR of Belgium, which already had a major multinational operation. Since then, it has continued to expand, with complete buy out of CBR, and purchases in eastern Europe and Asia. A major step was the acquisition of Scancem in 1999, with operations in Northern Europe as well as Africa. Indocement in Indonesia was included in 2001.

In May 2007, the British company Hanson was acquired, a transaction worth £7.85 billion (US$15.8 billion), which gave the company a stronger market position in the United Kingdom and the United States, and turned HeidelbergCement into the world's leading producer of aggregates.

HeidelbergCement has (2010) 29 cement and grinding plants in Western and Northern Europe, 19 in Eastern Europe and Central Asia, 16 cement plants in North America, and 14 in Africa and the Mediterranean Basin. The company sold Maxit Group and its 35% share in Vicat Cement to help finance its acquisition of Hanson plc in August 2007. In most of the group's European countries, HeidelbergCement is the market leader in the cement business.

Adolf Merckle was a big investor in HeidelbergCement. A capital increase in HeidelbergCement in September 2009, combined with a selling of shares from the Merckle family, opened up for other international owners and higher trading volumes on the stock exchanges. In August 2006, HeidelbergCement AG entered the Indian cement market with the acquisition of Mysore Cement.

In 2013, the cement company CJSC Construction Materials based in the Russian Republic of Bashkortostan was acquired.

On 1 July 2016, HeidelbergCement AG completed the acquisition of a 45% shareholding in Italcementi S.p.A. With the acquisition, HeidelbergCement becomes the number 1 producer of aggregates, the number 2 in cement and number 3 in ready mixed concrete worldwide. The company agreed to sell its assets in the United States for $660 million to Cementos Argos to fulfil anti trust requirements for the takeover.

The Heidelberg headquarters on Berliner Strasse, built in 1963, were demolished in 2017 and a larger new building was built on the same site by 2020 for around 100 million euros.

HeidelbergCement has entered new important markets, such as France and Italy in Europe, Egypt and Morocco in North Africa and Thailand in Southeast Asia. In the Canada, India and Kazakhstan, the takeover will further strengthen the existing market presence of HeidelbergCement. The enlarged group has activities in around sixty countries, with 60,000 employees working at 3,000 production sites. HeidelbergCement operates 139 cement plants with an annual cement capacity of 176 million tonnes, more than 1,500 ready mixed concrete production sites, and over 600 aggregates quarries.

The company worldwide
HeidelbergCement's Global Corporate Headquarters are located in Heidelberg, Germany.

The company operates in over 50 countries/territories around the world including:

Structures operating in Russia
Cement factory, Sterlitamak
Cement factory "CESLA", Slantsy, Leningrad Oblast
Cement factory, Novogurovsky

Controversial activities and criticism

Climate change 

As cement manufacturing is an extremely CO₂ intensive process, the cement industry is one of the main contributors to climate change, being responsible for 8 percent of global emissions. Therefore, from all companies traded on the DAX, HeidelbergCement is the second largest CO₂-emitter. For this reason, there have already been numerous protests by environmental groups, like Fridays For Future, Extinction Rebellion and Greenpeace. In August 2020, the local group "Wurzeln im Beton" ("Roots in Concrete") blocked the main entrance to the company's headquarters and in May 2021, its cement plant near Heidelberg was blocked by the local Extinction Rebellion chapter.

Indonesia 

HeidelbergCement has been heavily involved in the planned construction of a controversial cement plant on the Indonesian island of Java through its subsidiary "Indocement". The objective is the exploitation of the Kendeng mountains against the resistance of the people living there.

In addition to the destruction of the complex ecological system, the construction also has created the marginalization of partially indigenous living inhabitants of the region to follow. In this region, the indigenous known as Sedulur Kendeng are protesting against the planned mining operation of PT Semen Indonesia, a state owned enterprise. In March 2017, 50 protestors poured concrete over their feet in front of the Presidential Palace in Jakarta. This is the second time this has occurred in eleven months.

In addition to the protest against the factory building and its ecological consequences as "misconceived `development` at the expense of indigenous and peasants", the activists also appealed politically at HeidelbergCement that a multinational "company should not invest in environmental destruction and human rights violations, in any country in the world."

In September 2020, representatives of the local communities submitted a complaint to the German government. It alleges HeidelbergCement's plans in the Kendeng mountains to threaten their livelihoods, water resources and the local ecosystem as well as sites sacred to local Indigenous Samin communities. As a member of the Organisation for Economic Co-operation and Development (OECD), Germany maintains a National Contact Point that addresses complaints against German companies for overseas violations of the OECD Guidelines on Multinational Enterprises. The guidelines contain standards on human rights and the environment.

West Bank 

In Israeli occupied West Bank HeidelbergCement's wholly owned subsidiary Hanson Israel manufactures ready-made cement, aggregates and asphalt for Israel's construction industry. In March 2009, the Israeli human rights organization Yesh Din filed a petition with the Israeli high court demanding a halt to mining activity in West Bank quarries, including Hanson Israel's Nahal Raba quarry.

According to research of the ARD magazine "Panorama" on 2 September 2010, and the ARD Studios Tel Aviv, the minerals produced are brought to Israel without any benefit to the Palestinian communities. Palestinians from the village of az-Zawiya in the immediate vicinity of the quarry lay claim to the land. The Israeli Supreme Court rejected the petition from Yesh Din in December 2011.

In 2015, HeidelbergCement founded a new subsidiary, HeidelbergCement Palestine and started the import of cement to Gaza and West Bank. HeidelbergCement Palestine is now in the process of setting up quarry operations in Palestine. The largest Danish pension fund, PFA Pension(Da), has divested its interest from HeidelbergCement, due to "Violation of basic human rights, which conflicts with UN Global Compact principles 1 and 2."

See also
List of companies traded on the DAX
Main HeidelbergCement competitors are: 
 LafargeHolcim
 Cemex
 Eurocement group

References

External links

 

Cement companies of Germany
Cement
Companies listed on the Frankfurt Stock Exchange
Manufacturing companies established in 1874
German companies established in 1874
German brands
Multinational companies headquartered in Germany